1,N6-Ethanoadenine or epsilonA is a tricyclic derivative of adenine, where an ethylene bridge connect the amine group to the adjacent carbon on the six member ring, to add another five membered ring. This kind of modification can take place as a mutation of DNA. As a DNA modification it is called an etheno (ε) DNA adduct. Chloroacetaldehyde and 1,3-bis(2-chloroethyl)-1-nitrosourea (BCNU) can react with adenine to form 1,N6-ethanoadenine.

Escherichia coli can fix these modifications using AlkB protein.

Another way to produce it is via cyclisation of N6-hydroxyethyladenine with DIAD and triphenylphosphine in the Mitsunobu reaction in a THF/MeCN solvent or by reacting with SOCl2.

References

Purines
Heterocyclic compounds with 3 rings